Mary Godwin may refer to:
Mary Godwin (artist) (1887–1960), British artist
Mary Jane Godwin, English author, publisher, and bookseller
Mary Wollstonecraft, wife of William Godwin
Mary Shelley, daughter of William Godwin and Mary Wollstonecraft, wife of Percy Bysshe Shelley